"New York" is the debut single by American rapper Angel Haze released on October 8, 2012. The song was released as a single from their third mixtape Reservation, subsequently featuring on their debut extended play New York and the deluxe edition of their debut studio album Dirty Gold. Produced by The 83rd, the beat samples a clapping loop from Gil Scott-Heron’s track “New York Is Killing Me”. The official music video for the song was directed by Adrienne Nicole.

Charts

References

External links
 

2012 singles
2012 songs
American hip hop songs
Island Records singles